Domenico Pittella (7 February 1932 – 15 April 2018) was an Italian politician.

He was born on 7 February 1932 in Lauria. Pittella was trained as a surgeon. A member of the Italian Socialist Party, he served on the Senate between 1972 and 1983. He fell and broke his hip on 14 February 2018, and died in Lauria, aged 86, on 15 April of complications from the injury.

Pittella's sons Marcello and Gianni are also politicians.

References

1932 births
2018 deaths
People from Lauria
Italian Socialist Party politicians
Senators of Legislature VI of Italy
Senators of Legislature VII of Italy
Senators of Legislature VIII of Italy
Politicians of Basilicata
Italian surgeons